Cainsville is a community straddling the boundary of Brantford and Brant County in Ontario, Canada.

Cainsville started off as a rural Black Canadian settlement called Bunnell's Landing. Joseph Brant had given an initial land grant to a handful of free, formerly enslaved Africans. Throughout the 1800s other black settlers, who were not part of the original land grant, purchased land in the area to be close to a larger black community. Most of the settlers were African American freedom seekers or descendants of those who had escaped to the area through the Underground Railroad. It was named after Peter Cain, one of the first settlers, and was laid out in 1837.

Ontario Highway 53, runs through the community. This was the main East-West provincial highway until the completion of Highway 403 in 1997, which reduced the use of Highway 53 to local traffic. The Hamilton–Brantford–Cambridge Trails, part of the Southern loop of the Trans Canada Trail runs through Cainsville.

A commemorative plaque in the area reads:Bunnell’s Landing: Early Black Settlement

When Joseph Brant and his supporters came to Canada from New York in 1784 they brought their American slaves with them to the Grand River Valley. Slavery was abolished in the British Empire by 1834 and so most of the Black families stayed here and settled along the river near Cainsville. Fugitive slaves from the South later joined them, coming through Buffalo across Lake Erie and then up the Grand River.

Until the Grand River Navigation Company locks were built in 1848, this site was as far up the river as cargo boats could travel. Later the Toronto, Hamilton and Buffalo Railways shipped goods from Brantford’s factories along this rail line. The landslide of 1986 destroyed the tracks and buried most evidence of settlement in this area.

Across the river from Bunnell’s Landing is Bow Park Farm, the home of George Brown (1818-1880), Journalist and Statesman. He was founder of the Canadian Liberal Party and of the Toronto Globe Newspaper. He also played an important role in Confederation.

Present day
At the time of the 2021 Canadian Census, the area had a total population of 3,251. The portion located in the City of Brantford had a population of 2,652 while the portion in Brant County had 599 residents. The area in Brantford experienced rapid population growth in recent decades due to the establishment of several subdivisions along Garden Ave and Johnson Road. The area in Brant County remains largely rural, with some industrial and commercial activity.

A new 9,200 sq.ft Cainsville Community Centre is slated for development in the community at 15 Ewart Drive. The new building is expected to be completed in 2023.

See also

 List of unincorporated communities in Ontario

References 

Communities in the County of Brant
Populated places on the Underground Railroad
Black Canadian culture in Ontario
Black Canadian settlements
Brantford